Michael Basson (born 26 May 1958) is a South African former cricketer. He played in one first-class match for Eastern Province in 1980/81.

See also
 List of Eastern Province representative cricketers

References

External links
 

1958 births
Living people
South African cricketers
Eastern Province cricketers
People from Uitenhage
Cricketers from the Eastern Cape